The Tiffanian North American Stage on the geologic timescale is the North American  faunal stage according to the North American Land Mammal Ages chronology (NALMA), typically set from 60,200,000 to 56,800,000 years BP lasting . 

It is usually considered to overlap the Selandian and Thanetian within the Paleocene. 

The Tiffanian is preceded by the Torrejonian and followed by the Clarkforkian NALMA stages.

Substages
The Tiffanian is considered to contain the following substages:
Ti6: Lower boundary source of the base of the Tiffanian (approximate).
Ti5 Lower boundary source of the base of the Tiffanian (approximate) and upper boundary source of the base of the Clarkforkian (approximate).
Ti4: Lower boundary source of the base of the Tiffanian (approximate) and upper boundary source of the base of the Clarkforkian (approximate).
Ti3: Lower boundary source of the base of the Tiffanian (approximate) and upper boundary source of the base of the Clarkforkian (approximate).
Ti2: Lower boundary source of the base of the Tiffanian (approximate) and upper boundary source of the base of the Clarkforkian (approximate).
Ti1: Upper boundary source of the base of the Clarkforkian (approximate)

Fauna

Notable mammals 
Multituberculata - non-therian mammals

 Neoplagiaulax, neoplagiaulacid multituberculate
 Ptilodus, squirrel-sized ptilodontid

Metatheria - marsupials

 Peradectes, peradectid marsupial

Apatotheria - primitive, arboreal mammals

 Labidolemur, aye-aye-like arboreal mammal

Condylarthra - archaic ungulates

 Claenodon, large, arctocyonid condylarth
 Ectocion, phenacodontid condylarth
 Lambertocyon, arctocyonid condylarth
 Phenacodus, phenacodontid condylarth
 Thryptacodon, raccoon-like arctocyonid condylarth

Dinocerata - large, tusked herbivores

 Probathyopsis, early North American uintathere

Eulipotyphla - insectivorous mammals

 Adunator, erinaceomorph insectivore
 Leptacodon, nyctitheriid insectivore
 Litocherus, erinaceomorph insectivore

Primatomorpha - primates and relatives

 Carpodaptes, carpolestid plesiadapiform
 Carpolestes, carpolestid plesiadapiform
 Chiromyoides, small plesiadapid
 Ignacius, paramomyid plesiadapiform
 Nannodectes, basal plesiadapid
 Phenacolemur, paramomyid plesiadapiform
 Plesiadapis, plesiadapid plesiadapiform

Proteutheria - basal eutherians

 Palaeoryctes, small insectivorous mammal

References

 

 
Paleocene life
Paleocene animals of North America